Para-cycling at the 2019 Parapan American Games in Lima, Peru consisted of road and track disciplines. The road competitions were held at the Circuito San Miguel while the track competitions were held at the velodrome.

Medal table

Medalists

Road cycling

Non-medal events
 Women's Road Race H3-5
 Mixed Road Race H1-2

Track cycling

Men's event

Women's event

References

2019 Parapan American Games
2019 in cycle racing